Madonna and Child with the Infant St. John the Baptist is a 1490–1495 oil on canvas painting by Giovanni Bellini, probably with some additions by his studio assistants. It is now in the Indianapolis Museum of Art. It measures 76.2 × 58.4 cm.

References

1495 paintings
Indianapolis